Fabrizio Ravanelli (born 11 December 1968) is an Italian football manager and former international player.

A former striker, Ravanelli started and ended his playing career at hometown club Perugia Calcio, and also played for Middlesbrough, Juventus and Marseille. He won five titles with Juventus, including a Serie A championship in 1995 and a Champions League title in 1996 where he scored in the final. In all, during his career he played with twelve clubs from four countries; his native Italy, England, France and Scotland. Nicknamed 'The White Feather', he earned 22 caps for the Italy national team, scoring 8 goals, and was a member of the Italian squad that took part at UEFA Euro 1996.

Club career

Early career in Italy
Ravanelli began his club career with his hometown club Perugia Calcio in 1986, where he remained until 1989. He had a spell with Avellino later that year, and subsequently played with Casertana for a season. In 1990, he moved to Reggiana, where he remained for two seasons.

Juventus
After joining Juventus in 1992, he formed a formidable offensive line alongside players such as Roberto Baggio, Gianluca Vialli, Paolo Di Canio, Pierluigi Casiraghi, Andreas Möller, and Alessandro Del Piero. Affectionately known as the "White Feather" (in Italian: Penna Bianca) in recognition of his prematurely white hair (a nickname which had also previously belonged to former Juventus legend Roberto Bettega), he was one of Europe's top goalscorers in the mid-1990s. After initially struggling to obtain a starting spot under Giovanni Trapattoni, due to competition from several other strikers, he eventually managed to break into the starting line-up. During the 1994–95 season, under Marcello Lippi, he played a key role as the club claimed a domestic double, playing in an attacking trident, alongside Vialli, and either Baggio or Del Piero. With the Turin club, Ravanelli won one Serie A title (1994–95), one Coppa Italia (1994–95), one Supercoppa Italiana (1995), one Champions League (1995–96), where he scored in the final against Ajax, and one UEFA Cup (1992–93). On 27 September 1994, he memorably scored all five goals for Juventus against CSKA Sofia in a 5–1 win. In the 1996 UEFA Champions League Final, he put Juventus 1–0 up at the Stadio Olimpico in Rome. Ajax subsequently equalised, but Juventus still won the game through a penalty shootout.

Middlesbrough
Ravanelli made an immediate positive impact on moving to the Premier League with Bryan Robson's Middlesbrough on a £7 million transfer in 1996, where his success was sustained. He scored a hat-trick on his league debut against Liverpool on the opening day of the 1996–97 season. Despite being one of the league's top scorers, Middlesbrough were relegated in the year that he joined. He did, however, help them to the final of both domestic cup competitions that season. He started both finals, as Middlesbrough lost 2–0 against Chelsea in the FA Cup Final, and Leicester City 1–0 in the replay of the League Cup Final. Against Leicester, he scored the first goal in the final of the first meeting, only for Emile Heskey to equalise and send the game to a replay, which Leicester subsequently won. He alienated himself from teammates and fans, with his constant complaints and criticisms of the club's training regime and facilities, as well as the town itself, despite being the highest paid footballer in the Premiership at the time. Whilst at the club, he resided in the local small North Yorkshire village of Hutton Rudby, where Middlesbrough football associates, such as Paul Merson, Gordon McQueen and several other notable individuals have had residences.

Marseille
After Middlesbrough's relegation, Ravanelli moved to Olympique de Marseille. In the 1998–99 season, Marseille finished in second place in the French Division 1, one point behind Girondins de Bordeaux. The following season l'OM competed in the 1999–2000 UEFA Champions League, with Ravanelli scoring once against Sturm Graz at the Stade Vélodrome.

Lazio
In January 2000, Ravanelli returned to Italy to sign for Lazio. Ravanelli won his second Scudetto as Lazio ended the 1999–2000 season as champions, also winning the Coppa Italia, and the Supercoppa Italiana.

Derby County
In July 2001, Ravanelli joined Derby County on a free transfer, signing a two-year deal, but could not save the club from relegation in 2002. Due to Derby's financial problems, they had to defer his wage payments which they paid for several years.

Dundee
He then joined Dundee, following the end of his Derby contract, but was sacked after the club released all of their top earners. The only game in which Ravanelli scored for Dundee was against Clyde in a League Cup match, when he scored a hat-trick.

Perugia
After the experience in Scotland, he returned to Italy to finish his career with his hometown club Perugia, with whom he had also started his professional career, with the aim of trying to save the club from relegation.

International career
Ravanelli earned 22 caps for the Italy national team between 1995 and 1999, under managers Arrigo Sacchi, Cesare Maldini, and Dino Zoff, scoring eight goals. He made his international debut under Sacchi on 25 March 1995, in a 4–1 home victory over Estonia, in an UEFA Euro 1996 qualifying fixture in Salerno, also scoring his first international goal during the match. He was a member of the Italian squad that took part at UEFA Euro 1996, and made two appearances throughout the tournament, which came in Italy's opening two group matches, a 2–1 win over Russia, and a 2–1 loss against the Czech Republic, as Italy were eliminated in the first round. He missed out on a spot at the 1998 FIFA World Cup, however, as striker Enrico Chiesa was selected by Maldini in his place.

Player profile

Style of play
Ravanelli was a quick, dynamic, physically strong, and hardworking left-footed striker, with notable temperament, who was known for his eye for goal, as well as his energy and defensive contribution off the ball, which often saw him drop back into deeper positions in order to help his team win back possession. Although he was initially not the most naturally talented or skilful player, he was able to improve his technique and movement significantly during his time with Juventus, where he established himself as a top striker.

A prolific goalscorer, who was good in the air, and who possessed a powerful and accurate shot, in addition to his ability to score goals, Ravanelli was also capable of playing off his teammates, due to his link-up play, which, combined with his other skills, made him a complete forward. This also enabled him to play in a supporting role, as a second striker or even as a winger, positions in which he often utilised his ability in the air to get on the end of high balls and create chances for other strikers by providing them with headed assists from knockdowns.

Goal celebrations
Ravanelli's signature goal celebration involved him pulling his shirt over his head and running around the field. He was therefore a strong opposer of the new FIFA regulation, which impeded players from removing their shirts during post goal-celebrations, and which punished any violators with a yellow card.

Managerial career

Juventus
Ravanelli started his coaching career with the Juventus youth team. He joined the club's coaching staff in July 2011 and remained there until 2013.

AC Ajaccio
On 8 June 2013, Ravanelli signed a two-year contract as the new head coach of Ligue 1 club AC Ajaccio. 
On 2 November 2013, he was sacked from his post after his club had suffered its fifth consecutive Ligue 1 defeat (this time losing 3–1 at home against Valenciennes FC) on the same day that left them in 19th (second from bottom) position (1 win, 4 draws and 7 defeats in 12 Ligue 1 matches) in the Ligue 1 standings. "It is not an easy decision (to sack Ravanelli) for a number of reasons. I really appreciated Fabrizio Ravanelli, I really wanted it to work. I do not remember seeing a staff work that much, from morning till night without stopping. You know what football is like. If things are not going well, the only solution is to change the staff," said Alain Orsoni, the president of AC Ajaccio.

Arsenal Kyiv
On 22 June 2018, Ravanelli signed contract with Ukrainian Premier League club Arsenal Kyiv. On 22 September 2018, Ravanelli resigned after the string of unsuccessful results.

Media career
Following his retirement, Ravanelli also worked as a football pundit for Sky Italia, Fox Sports, and Mediaset.

Personal life
It has been mistakenly reported in some sources that Luca Ravanelli, a defender, is Fabrizio's son. According to Luca, he is not.

Career statistics

Club

International

Scores and results list Italy's goal tally first, score column indicates score after each Ravanelli goal.

Manager

Honours
Juventus
 Serie A: 1994–95
 Coppa Italia: 1994–95
 Supercoppa Italiana: 1995
 UEFA Champions League: 1995–96
 UEFA Cup: 1992–93
UEFA Cup: Runner-up: 1994–95

Lazio
 Serie A: 1999–2000
 Coppa Italia: 1999–2000
 Supercoppa Italiana: 2000

Individual
Coppa Italia top scorer: 1994–95 (six goals)
Serie C2 top scorer: 1987–88 (23 goals)

References

External links

Ravanelli's Official Website – Home Page
Profile at LegaSerieA.it 
Profile at FIGC.it 

1968 births
Living people
Sportspeople from Perugia
Association football forwards
Italian footballers
Italian football managers
Italy international footballers
A.C. Reggiana 1919 players
Juventus F.C. players
A.C. Perugia Calcio players
Casertana F.C. players
Middlesbrough F.C. players
Olympique de Marseille players
S.S. Lazio players
Derby County F.C. players
Dundee F.C. players
Serie A players
Serie B players
Serie C players
Ligue 1 players
Premier League players
Scottish Premier League players
UEFA Euro 1996 players
Italian expatriate footballers
Expatriate footballers in England
Expatriate footballers in France
Expatriate footballers in Scotland
Italian expatriate sportspeople in France
Italian expatriate sportspeople in England
Italian expatriate sportspeople in Scotland
Italian expatriate football managers
Expatriate football managers in France
Expatriate football managers in Ukraine
Italian expatriate sportspeople in Ukraine
AC Ajaccio managers
FC Arsenal Kyiv managers
Ligue 1 managers
Ukrainian Premier League managers
Footballers from Umbria
English Football League players
UEFA Champions League winning players
UEFA Cup winning players
FA Cup Final players